Yakovlevina is a genus of moths in the family Cossidae.

Species
 Yakovlevina albostriata (Yakovlev, 2006)
 Yakovlevina galina (Yakovlev, 2004)

References

 , 2005: Nomenclatural notes on various taxa of the moths (Lepidoptera). Centre for Entomological Studies Ankara, Miscellaneous Papers 91/92: 11-14.
 , 2004: New taxa of Cossidae from SE Asia. Atalanta 35(3-4): 369-382.
 , 2006, New Cossidae (Lepidoptera) from Asia, Africa and Macronesia, Tinea 19 (3): 188-213.

External links
Natural History Museum Lepidoptera generic names catalog

Zeuzerinae